Rockwood may refer to:

Places

Canada
 Rockwood, Manitoba, rural municipality
 Rockwood (electoral division), former provincial electoral division
 Rockwood, Winnipeg, a neighbourhood
 Rockwood, the main community in Guelph/Eramosa township, Ontario
 Rockwood Conservation Area
 Rockwood Institution, federal prison in Manitoba
 Rockwood Village - Mississauga, a subdivision in Toronto, Ontario

United States
 Rockwood, California
 Rockwood Museum and Park, Wilmington, Delaware, listed on the NRHP in Delaware
 Rockwood, Illinois
 Rockwood, Maine
 Rockwood, Michigan
 South Rockwood, Michigan
 Rockwood, Gresham, Oregon
 Rockwood, Pennsylvania
 Rockwood, Tennessee
 Rockwood, Texas
 Rockwood, Virginia
 Rockwood, Wisconsin
 Rockwood Library, Portland, Oregon
 Rockwood Lodge, former training facility of the Green Bay Packers
 Rockwood School District, St. Louis County, Missouri
 Rockwood Area School District, Somerset County, Pennsylvania
 Rockwood Area Junior/Senior High School, Somerset County, Pennsylvania
 Rockwood Township, Minnesota (disambiguation)
 Rockwood (Dublin, Virginia), listed on the NRHP in Pulaski County, Virginia
 Rockwood (Montpelier Station, Virginia), historic house listed on the NRHP in Virginia
 Rockwood, a South Hill neighborhood in Spokane, Washington
 Rockwood Historic District, Spokane, WA, listed on the NRHP in Spokane County, Washington
 Rockwood / East 188th Avenue, light rail station in Gresham, Oregon
 Rockwood Municipal Airport, general aviation airport near Rockwood, Tennessee
 Rockwood Precinct, Randolph County, Illinois
 Rockwood Chocolate Factory Historic District, Brooklyn, New York

People
 Albert P. Rockwood (1805-1879), LDS leader
 Angela Rockwood, model and actress
 George G. Rockwood (1832-1911), New York City photographer
 John Rockwood (1881-1935), physician, army officer, and cricket administrator in Ceylon
 Lawrence Rockwood (b. 1958), human rights activist
 Roy Rockwood, pseudonym of several authors of books for boys
 W. G. Rockwood (1843-1909), physician and politician in Ceylon
 Wendell D. Rockwood, Massachusetts politician
 Ebenezer Rockwood Hoar (1816-1895), American politician and justice
 Rockwood Hoar (1855-1906), Massachusetts politician

Other
Rockwood & Company, chocolate company based in Brooklyn, New York, USA

See also
Rockwood Academy (disambiguation)
Rockwood Park (disambiguation)
Rookwood (disambiguation)